Yoshifumi Okada (岡田 幸文, born July 6, 1984 in Takanezawa, Tochigi) is a Japanese former professional baseball outfielder. He played for the Chiba Lotte Marines in Japan's Nippon Professional Baseball from 2010 to 2018.

External links

1984 births
Living people
Baseball people from Tochigi Prefecture
Japanese baseball players
Chiba Lotte Marines players
Nippon Professional Baseball outfielders
Japanese baseball coaches
Nippon Professional Baseball coaches